"Sweet Sticky Thing" is the name of a popular song by funk band Ohio Players, and released on the classic 1975 album, Honey. 
The song spent a week at number one on the Hot Soul Singles chart. It peaked at number 33 on the Billboard Hot 100 singles chart. It was the third of five songs that they would take to the top of the R&B chart.

Chart positions

Cover Versions
In 1993, French pianist Alex Bugnon covered the song on his album "This Time Around."
In 2012, American flutist Ragan Whiteside covered the song on her album "Evolve".
In 2020, Japanese trumpeter Takuya Kuroda covered the song on his album "Fly Moon Die Soon".

External links

[ Song Review] on the Allmusic website

1975 singles
Ohio Players songs
1975 songs
Mercury Records singles